St Michael's Victory over the Devil is a 1958 bronze sculpture by Jacob Epstein, displayed on the south end of the east wall outside of the new Coventry Cathedral, above the steps leading up from Priory Street to the cathedral's entrance and beside the stained glass of John Piper's bowed baptistry window.  The cathedral is dedicated to St Michael.

The sculpture symbolises the victory of good over evil, and depicts a winged angel with spear, standing with arms and legs spread above the bound figure of the horned devil lying supine. For the face of the angel, Epstein made busts of his daughter Kitty's two husbands, Lucian Freud and Wynne Godley, and selected Godley as his model. The angel's body may be inspired by Epstein's 1944–45 statue of Lucifer, now at Birmingham Museum and Art Gallery. The features of the devil may be based on a distorted version of Epstein himself.

He made several preliminary studies in plasticine and bronze, and had started to work on the main work by the time his commission was approved in 1957. Reportedly, some members of the cathedral reconstruction committee objected to Epstein being commissioned, with one complaining "But he is a Jew", to which the architect Basil Spence responded "So was Jesus Christ". A similar controversy had arisen before, when Epstein created his floating lead statue of the Virgin Mother and Holy Child for the Convent of the Holy Child in Cavendish Square, London (now the offices of the King's Fund).

The sculpture was one of the last major works of art completed by Epstein before his death on 21 August 1959.  It was cast in bronze and unveiled at the cathedral in 1961 by Epstein's widow, Kathleen.

One maquette now resides in the chapel of Wesley House,  Cambridge.

References
 
 St Michael and the Devil – Statue by Jacob Epstein, The Coventry Society
 St. Michael and the Devil & the West Window, Historic Coventry
 Sir Jacob Epstein (1880–1959), Maquette for St Michael and the Devil, Christie's, 20 November 2014

Sculptures by Jacob Epstein
1958 sculptures
Bronze sculptures in the United Kingdom
Outdoor sculptures in England
Coventry Cathedral
Michael (archangel)
Satan
Sculptures of angels